The Piracy Act 1837 (7 Will 4 & 1 Vict c 88) is an Act of the Parliament of the United Kingdom. It abolished the death penalty for most offences of piracy, but created a new offence often known as piracy with violence, which was punishable with death. This offence still exists in the United Kingdom and in the Republic of Ireland, but is no longer punishable by death in either country.

Section 2 of the Act creates the offence of piracy with violence:

United Kingdom

The offences of piracy which existed in 1837 have since been abolished. The "crime of piracy" mentioned in section 2 is now defined by the Merchant Shipping and Maritime Security Act 1997 (in section 26 and Schedule 5), which simply sets out articles 101 to 103 of the United Nations Convention on the Law of the Sea (1982):

Article 101
  
Definition of piracy

Piracy consists of any of the following acts:
(a) any illegal acts of violence or detention, or any act of depredation, committed for private ends by the crew or the passengers of a private ship or a private aircraft, and directed—
(i) on the high seas, against another ship or aircraft, or against persons or property on board such ship or aircraft; 
(ii) against a ship, aircraft, persons or property in a place outside the jurisdiction of any State; 
(b) any act of voluntary participation in the operation of a ship or of an aircraft with knowledge of facts making it a pirate ship or aircraft;
(c) any act of inciting or of intentionally facilitating an act described in subparagraph (a) or (b).
 
Article 102
  
Piracy by a warship, government ship or government aircraft whose crew has mutinied

The acts of piracy, as defined in article 101, committed by a warship, government ship or government aircraft whose crew has mutinied and taken control of the ship or aircraft are assimilated to acts committed by a private ship or aircraft. 
  
Article 103
  
Definition of a pirate ship or aircraft

A ship or aircraft is considered a pirate ship or aircraft if it is intended by the persons in dominant control to be used for the purpose of committing one of the acts referred to in article 101. The same applies if the ship or aircraft has been used to commit any such act, so long as it remains under the control of the persons guilty of that act.

Since this definition is restricted to the high seas, piracy in British territorial waters would today be treated as robbery, assault or attempted murder under the Territorial Waters Jurisdiction Act 1878, or as hijacking under the Aviation and Maritime Security Act 1990 (which can also be applied to piracy on the high seas).

In 1998 the mandatory death penalty was abolished, and the sentence is now up to life imprisonment.

Ireland
Ireland abolished the death penalty for piracy in 1964. The Act remains in force.

See also
Capital punishment in the United Kingdom
Capital punishment in Ireland
Piracy Act 1698 (repealed)
Piracy Act 1717 (repealed)
Piracy Act 1721 (repealed)
Judgement of Death Act 1823

References

External links
The Piracy Act 1837, as amended from the National Archives.
The Piracy Act 1837, as originally enacted from the National Archives.

1837 in British law
United Kingdom Acts of Parliament 1837
English criminal law
Piracy law
Piracy in the United Kingdom
Death penalty law
Capital punishment in the United Kingdom